My World is the debut album by Puerto Rican reggaeton duo Dyland & Lenny. It was released on March 2, 2010. The first single from the album was titled "Nadie Te Amará Como Yo", which reached #33 on Billboard Hot Latin Songs charts. My World was nominated for a Lo Nuestro Award for Urban Album of the Year.

Track listing
Standard Edition:

Charts

References 

2010 debut albums
Dyland & Lenny albums
Albums produced by Luny Tunes